Iain Grieve (born 19 February 1987 in Jwaneng, Botswana) is a rugby union back-rower who currently plays for Bristol Harlequins Rfc.

Grieve moved to Bristol from Botswana at the age of 15, and joined the Bristol Rugby Academy soon after. He has represented England at U18, U19 and U21 level.

Grieve become a regular first team player for Bristol during the 2008-09 Guinness Premiership and was appointed Playing Captain for the 2010-11 RFU Championship. Bristol Rugby Chairman Chris Booy announced that he would captain the club for the second time during the 2011-12 RFU Championship.

Grieve was released by Bristol Rugby in June 2014, and signed on for Plymouth Albion. Ealing Trailfinders then secured his services in May 2015 following Plymouth's relegation to National League 1. He was released by Ealing in May 2017.

References

External links
Guinness Premiership profile
Bristol profile

Living people
1987 births
Botswana emigrants to England
English rugby union players
Bristol Bears players
Hartpury University R.F.C. players